Exeter Chiefs (officially Exeter Rugby Club) is an English professional rugby union club based in Exeter, Devon. They play in Premiership Rugby, England's top division of rugby.

The club was founded in 1871 and since 2006 has played its home matches at Sandy Park, a purpose-built facility on the outskirts of the city. They have been known by the name Chiefs since 1999. The club was promoted to the Premiership for the first time in 2010. Since promotion, the Chiefs have become one of the leading clubs in the Premiership, winning the championship title twice, in 2016–17 and 2019–20 respectively, and reaching a further four finals. In October 2020, the Chiefs won the Champions Cup, the top prize in European club rugby union, for the first time, defeating French club Racing 92 in the final of a tournament that was disrupted by the COVID-19 pandemic.

Exeter are the only club to win the top four tiers of English rugby, winning the Premiership in 2017 and 2020, RFU Championship in 2010, National League 1 in 1997 and National League 2 South in 1996. They have won the Anglo-Welsh Cup/Premiership Rugby Cup three times, most recently in 2022–23, and the European Rugby Champions Cup once, in 2020.

The current director of rugby is Rob Baxter, who was appointed in March 2009.

History

Early years
Exeter Rugby Club was founded in 1871. The club played its first match in 1873 against St. Luke's College, and in 1890 won the Devon Cup. In 1905, the club hosted the first match played by New Zealand on English soil and also in the Northern Hemisphere, at the County Ground. The visitors fixture was against a Devon County XV. It was from that game that New Zealand became known as the "All Blacks".

When league rugby started, Exeter were initially placed in the Devon leagues.

Early league and professional era
In 1993 and 1995, Exeter reached the quarter finals of the Pilkington Cup before being knocked out by top division opponents Leicester Tigers and London Wasps respectively.

In 1997, Exeter were promoted into the Premiership Two for the first time from National League 1. They regularly finished in the top half of the table. In 2005, Exeter finished second in the league, missing out on promotion by four points behind Bristol Rugby. The next season, they moved from the County Ground to Sandy Park due to a need for modern facilities that included corporate hospitality. In 2008 they again finished in second place and again missed out on promotion by finishing behind Northampton Saints. The same situation happened the next season when Exeter finished behind Leeds Carnegie.

Premiership
In 2009, National Division One was reorganised into the RFU Championship with playoffs. During the regular league season, Exeter finished second behind Bristol. In the playoffs, they defeated Bedford Blues and Nottingham, before facing Bristol in the two legged final. Exeter won 9–6 in the first leg at Sandy Park and then won 29–10 at Bristol's Memorial Stadium in the second leg to win promotion to the Premiership for the first time.

In their first season in the Premiership, they finished eighth despite a two-point deduction and a £5,000 fine for fielding too many overseas players during their match against Leeds Carnegie at Headingley Stadium. They also made their debut in the European Challenge Cup, making their way to the quarter finals where they lost to Stade Français. In the next season, they finished fifth in the Premiership which permitted them to play in the Heineken Cup for the first time. In their first season in the Heineken Cup, they were drawn against French Clermont Auvergne, Irish Leinster Rugby and Welsh Scarlets in the group stage. They finished the group third with nine points ahead of Scarlets. In 2014, Exeter Chiefs won their first major rugby trophy after they defeated Northampton Saints in the Anglo-Welsh Cup 15–8 at Sandy Park.

Recent seasons 
In the 2015–16 season the Chiefs finished in second place in Premiership Rugby entitling them to a home semi final in the Aviva Premiership which was played against Wasps. They won the match 34-23 thanks to two penalty tries, a try from Ian Whitten and a try from Dave Ewers as well as two penalties and four conversions from Gareth Steenson. This meant the Chiefs qualified to their first Aviva Premiership final on 28 May. They lost 28–20 to champions Saracens despite tries from England international Jack Nowell and club captain Jack Yeandle as well as 2 penalties and 2 conversions from Gareth Steenson.

The Chiefs also reached the quarter-final of the European Champions Cup in 2015–16. They were drawn away to Wasps in a tight game which they eventually lost 25–24 at the Ricoh Arena after Wasps' Jimmy Gopperth kicked a last-minute conversion.

In 2016–17, the Chiefs won the Premiership for the first time in their history by beating Wasps in the final 23–20. The game finished 20–20 at full time with captain Gareth Steenson slotting a late penalty to take it to extra time. In extra time, Steenson added another penalty to secure the victory.

The Chiefs finished the 2017–18 season eight points clear at the top of the Premiership Rugby table, but ultimately lost to 27–10 to Saracens in the final on 26 May 2018.

The Chiefs saw their most success to date during the 2019–20 season, winning an historic double of the European Rugby Champions Cup, in their first appearance in the final, and the Premiership.

In light of several controversies regarding their crest, the club unveiled a new logo ahead of the 2022–23 season (see below).

Stadium
Exeter play their home games at Sandy Park, which is located on the outskirts of the city. The club moved from their previous home, the County Ground, in 2006 having played there regularly since 1905. In 2002, Exeter Chiefs started looking for a new stadium because they felt the County Ground provided insufficient opportunities for growth. Despite concerns and opposition from traditionalists within the club, the motion to move was passed by 99% of the attendees at Exeter's annual general meeting. Sandy Park can accommodate 12,800 spectators, however, there are plans to increase this capacity to 20,600 with phase one having begun in early 2014. These plans came about because of a requirement for later stages of European matches to be played at grounds with a capacity of at least 20,000. Following recent East stand changes during 21/22, capacity now at 15,600

Logos and Uniforms

Current kit 
The kit is supplied by Samurai Rugby Gear. On the front of the shirt, Troy appear on the centre and the top left and Watson is on the top right. M.J Baker Foods is on the right sleeve. On the back of the shirt, Centrax is on the top while Sandy Park is on top of the squad number and Bradfords Building Supplies at the bottom. On the shorts, SW Comms (which also appear on the centre and the top left on the front of the shirt) is on the bottom left of the front shorts while on the back shorts, Frobishers Juices is at the top while Otter Brewery is on the bottom left.

Logo issue

In 1999, Exeter Rugby Club turned semi-professional and changed their name to Exeter Chiefs, adopting a logo of a man in a headdress. The team had previously been referred to as the Chiefs in the 1930s, and Exeter rugby sides have done so as far back as 1908. In 2016, the club's fans were called upon to change their behaviour over concerns that it could be considered an offensive appropriation of Native American culture. 

In July 2020, a group set up by Exeter Chiefs supporters called for the club's "racist use of Native American imagery and branding" to be dropped, comparing the use of the headdresses and chanting the tomahawk chop to blackface. A petition gained more than 550 signatures in a week, with Exeter's Labour MP, Ben Bradshaw, also publicly backing the move. By Wednesday 8 July the petition had grown to 2,000 signatures and the debate about whether a re-brand was needed gained widespread attention. By 29 July the petition had gained 3,700 signatures and the issue was considered by the Exeter Board of Directors, they decided their branding was "highly respectful" but nonetheless retired their mascot Big Chief which "could be regarded as disrespectful". This decision was called "tone deaf" by the petitioners and considered controversial in the wider press.

In October 2021, fellow Premiership club Wasps called on the RFU and Premiership Rugby to rule on the acceptability of Exeter fans wearing Native American-style headdresses and discouraged the visiting Exeter fans from wearing them, though they stopped short of a ban.  In November 2021 the National Congress of American Indians published an open letter calling for Exeter to drop their logo, the use of headdresses and venue names such as the 'Wigwam Bar', and that the continued use of such things perpetuated "dehumanising stereotypes". In response to this, the club stated that this issue would be addressed in the November AGM, and a decision made by the board of directors in the following weeks. 

On 27 January 2022 it was announced that the club would be dropping the Native American branding in July 2022. The club now use imagery depicting the Iron Age tribe, the Dumnonii.

Season summaries

Gold background denotes championsSilver background denotes runners-upPink background denotes relegated

Club honours

Exeter Chiefs
European Rugby Champions Cup
Champions: (1) 2019–20
Premiership Rugby
Champions: (2) 2016–17, 2019–20
Runners–Up: (4) 2015–16, 2017–18, 2018–19, 2020-21
Anglo-Welsh Cup /Premiership Rugby Cup
Champions: (3) 2013–14, 2017–18, 2022–23
Runners–Up: (2) 2014–15, 2016–17
RFU Championship
Champions: (1) 2009–10
Runners–Up: (3) 2004–05, 2007–08, 2008–09
National League 1
Champions: (1) 1996–97
National League 2 South
Champions: (1) 1995–96
EDF Energy Trophy
Runners–Up: (4) 2001–02, 2002–03, 2006–07, 2007–08
Devon RFU Senior Cup (tier 5)
Champions: (16) 1889–90, 1970–71, 1971–72, 1972–73, 1975–76, 1977–78, 1979–80, 1981–82, 1988–89, 1989–90, 1990–91, 1991–92, 1992–93, 1993–94, 1994–95, 1995–96
Runners–Up: (5) 1888-89, 1904-05, 1976-77,1980–81, 1985–86
Devon RFU Junior Cup
Champions: (1) 1905–06 (reserve side)
Runners–Up: (4) 1903–04 (reserve side)

Exeter Braves
Premiership Rugby Shield
Champions: (2) 2011–12, 2015–16

Current squad

The Exeter Chiefs squad for the 2022–23 season is:

Club staff

First Team Coaching

Academy

Notable former players

Lions tourists
The following players have toured with the Lions while playing for Exeter:

 2017: Jack Nowell, Tomas Francis
 2021: Stuart Hogg, Sam Simmonds, Jonny Hill, Luke Cowan-Dickie

Rugby World Cup
The following are players which have represented their countries at the Rugby World Cup, whilst playing for Exeter:

Notes

Academy squad

References

Further reading

External links

 

 
Premiership Rugby teams
English rugby union teams
Rugby union in Devon
Rugby clubs established in 1871
Sport in Exeter
1871 establishments in England